Te Haroto  is a rural community in the Hastings District and Hawke's Bay Region of New Zealand's North Island.

It is located roughly 60 kilometres northwest of Napier and southeast of Taupo on State Highway 5 Napier-Taupo Road.

The main village centres around Te Hāroto Marae. Te Rongopai is the wharepuni (meeting house) and Piriwiritua is the wharekai (dining hall) a meeting place for the iwi (tribe) of Ngāti Hineuru.

References

Hastings District
Populated places in the Hawke's Bay Region